Banjar may refer to:

People
Banjar people, an ethnic group in Indonesia
Banjar language, of the Banjar people

Geography
Banjar, Buleleng, a district in Bali province of Indonesia
Banjar, India, a town in Himachal Pradesh, India
Banjar, West Java, a city in West Java province of Indonesia
Banjar Regency, a regency in South Kalimantan province of Indonesia
Banjar Region, an autonomous area formed in the southeastern part of Indonesian island of Borneo by the Netherlands in 1948
Sultanate of Banjar, a former sultanate located in modern South Kalimantan Province of Indonesia

Other uses
Banjar (instrument), a stringed folk instrument, ancestor to the banjo

See also
Banja (disambiguation)

Language and nationality disambiguation pages